Emmanuel John Chukuwuemeka Nwodo , known more commonly as Emmanuel Nwodo (born 19 March 1974) is a Nigerian professional boxer who fights in the cruiserweight division.

Professional boxing record

|-
|align="center" colspan=8|23 Wins (19 knockouts, 4 decisions), 5 Losses (4 knockouts, 1 decision) 
|-
| align="center" style="border-style: none none solid solid; background: #e3e3e3"|Result
| align="center" style="border-style: none none solid solid; background: #e3e3e3"|Record
| align="center" style="border-style: none none solid solid; background: #e3e3e3"|Opponent
| align="center" style="border-style: none none solid solid; background: #e3e3e3"|Type
| align="center" style="border-style: none none solid solid; background: #e3e3e3"|Round
| align="center" style="border-style: none none solid solid; background: #e3e3e3"|Date
| align="center" style="border-style: none none solid solid; background: #e3e3e3"|Location
| align="center" style="border-style: none none solid solid; background: #e3e3e3"|Notes
|-align=center
|Win
|
|align=left| Lenzie Morgan
|TKO
|1
|29/08/2009
|align=left| City Armory, Lynchburg, Virginia, U.S.
|align=left|
|-
|Loss
|
|align=left| Matt Godfrey
|TKO
|4
|29/08/2008
|align=left| Mohegan Sun Casino, Uncasville, Connecticut, U.S.
|align=left|
|-
|Win
|
|align=left| Ezra Sellers
|KO
|2
|19/01/2008
|align=left| Madison Square Garden, New York City, U.S.
|align=left|
|-
|Loss
|
|align=left| Darnell Wilson
|KO
|11
|29/06/2007
|align=left| St. George Theatre, Staten Island, New York, U.S.
|align=left|
|-
|Win
|
|align=left| Chris Thomas
|TKO
|3
|01/07/2006
|align=left| ABC Sports Complex, Springfield, Virginia, U.S.
|align=left|
|-
|Win
|
|align=left| Ron Krull
|TKO
|1
|29/04/2006
|align=left| ABC Sports Complex, Springfield, Virginia, U.S.
|align=left|
|-
|Win
|
|align=left| John Douglas
|TKO
|4
|02/12/2005
|align=left| The Blue Horizon, Philadelphia, U.S.
|align=left|
|-
|Win
|
|align=left| Rayco Saunders
|UD
|8
|24/06/2005
|align=left| The Blue Horizon, Philadelphia, U.S.
|align=left|
|-
|Win
|
|align=left| Hilario Guzman
|TKO
|7
|18/02/2005
|align=left| The Blue Horizon, Philadelphia, U.S.
|align=left|
|-
|Win
|
|align=left| Imamu Mayfield
|TKO
|1
|03/12/2004
|align=left| The Blue Horizon, Philadelphia, U.S.
|align=left|
|-
|Win
|
|align=left| Frank Walker
|KO
|1
|08/10/2004
|align=left| The Blue Horizon, Philadelphia, U.S.
|align=left|
|-
|Win
|
|align=left| Willie Herring
|TKO
|4
|30/09/2004
|align=left| Michael's Eighth Avenue, Glen Burnie, Maryland, U.S.
|align=left|
|-
|Win
|
|align=left| Newton Kidd
|UD
|6
|10/09/2004
|align=left| The Blue Horizon, Philadelphia, U.S.
|align=left|
|-
|Win
|
|align=left| Tyrone Tate
|KO
|2
|31/08/2004
|align=left| Pennsylvania Convention Center, Philadelphia, U.S.
|align=left|
|-
|Loss
|
|align=left| Richel Hersisia
|TKO
|3
|18/01/2002
|align=left| Thyhallen, Thisted, Denmark
|align=left|
|-
|Win
|
|align=left| Anthony Musonye
|KO
|1
|04/08/2001
|align=left| Nairobi, Kenya
|align=left|
|-
|Loss
|
|align=left| Peter Odhiambo
|PTS
|6
|30/07/2000
|align=left| Nairobi, Kenya
|align=left|
|-
|Win
|
|align=left| Ahmed Salim
|KO
|4
|16/04/2000
|align=left| Kenya
|align=left|
|-
|Win
|
|align=left| Tom Okusi
|PTS
|8
|05/11/1999
|align=left| Kenya
|align=left|
|-
|Loss
|
|align=left| Joseph Akhasamba
|TKO
|5
|26/09/1999
|align=left| Nairobi, Kenya
|align=left|
|-
|
|
|align=left| John Martin Cyril
|TKO
|1
|09/07/1999
|align=left| Enugu, Nigeria
|align=left|
|-
|Win
|
|align=left| Paul Otewa
|KO
|6
|28/08/1999
|align=left| Kenya
|align=left|
|-
|Win
|
|align=left| Tom Okusi
|KO
|2
|10/04/1999
|align=left| Kenya
|align=left|
|-
|
|
|align=left| Joe John
|TKO
|2
|03/03/1999
|align=left| Kenya
|align=left|
|-
|Win
|
|align=left| Bob Harrison
|KO
|1
|01/01/1999
|align=left| Nairobi City Stadium, Nairobi, Kenya
|align=left|
|-
|Win
|
|align=left| Paul Otewa
|KO
|6
|28/08/1998
|align=left| Kenya
|align=left|
|-
|Win
|
|align=left| Joe John
|KO
|4
|05/06/1998
|align=left| Kenya
|align=left|
|-
|Win
|
|align=left| James Omondi
|PTS
|4
|07/03/1998
|align=left| Kenya
|align=left|
|}

References

External links
 

1974 births
Living people
Nigerian male boxers
Cruiserweight boxers
Heavyweight boxers
Sportspeople from Enugu